Temple of Israel Synagogue is the name of a building "built in 1921 to replace an earlier synagogue that was destroyed by fire." At present it houses a non-denominational Pentecostal church.

The building was listed on the National Register of Historic Places in 2014.

Prior use
Prior names include Beth Israel Synagogue and Temple Israel Synagogue. This historic synagogue building is located in the Oakley Park subdivision of Queens in New York City. It is a two-story, rectangular, steel frame and brick building in the Classical Revival style.  The front gable facade features an elaborate main entry with Ionic order stone columns.  The synagogue closed in 2001.

Subsequent to having closed as a synagogue, it became known as housing Haven Ministries.

References

Properties of religious function on the National Register of Historic Places in Queens, New York
Neoclassical architecture in New York (state)
Synagogues completed in 1921
Synagogues in Queens, New York
Synagogues on the National Register of Historic Places in New York (state)
Rockaway, Queens